The 1910 Kansas State Aggies football team represented Kansas State Agricultural College (now Kansas State University) in the 1910 college football season. In their sixth and final year under head coach Mike Ahearn, the Aggies compiled a 10–1 record, and outscored their opponents by a combined total of 336 to 28.

This is the only football season between 1902 and present that Kansas State did not face the University of Kansas.

Schedule

References

Kansas State
Kansas State Wildcats football seasons
Kansas State Aggies football